Thysanotus is a genus of beetles in the family Carabidae, containing the following species:

 Thysanotus ambreanus Jeannel, 1949 
 Thysanotus anchomenoides (Gory & Castelnau, 1837) 
 Thysanotus apicalis (Alluaud, 1936) 
 Thysanotus consobrinus Jeannel, 1949 
 Thysanotus dentipes (Jeannel, 1955) 
 Thysanotus dilutipes (Fairmaire, 1896) 
 Thysanotus gracilis Jeannel, 1949 
 Thysanotus madagascariensis (Chaudoir, 1850) 
 Thysanotus mirabilis (Alluaud, 1895) 
 Thysanotus nosybianus Jeannel, 1949 
 Thysanotus olsoufieffi Jeannel, 1949 
 Thysanotus spinipennis (Alluaud, 1936) 
 Thysanotus spinosus (Alluaud, 1936) 
 Thysanotus tenuestriatus Jeannel, 1949 
 Thysanotus vadoni Jeannel, 1949

References

Lebiinae